Free Flight  is an American jazz ensemble led by flutist Jim Walker.

History
Members have included Peter Erskine, Milcho Leviev, Ralph Humphrey, Brian Pezzone and Jimmy Lacefield. The ensemble has consisted of piano, flute, bass, and drums.

Currently, Jim Walker and Mike Garson are the only permanent members of the group that was formed in 1980. The bassist and drummer positions are now filled by college students or recent graduates that tour and perform as Free Flight.

Discography
 The Jazz/Classical Union (1982)
 Soaring (Palo Alto, 1983)
 Beyond the Clouds (Palo Alto, 1984)
 Illumination (Columbia, 1986)
 Slice of Life (Columbia, 1989)

References

External links

American jazz ensembles
Palo Alto Records artists
Columbia Records artists